Miss Universe 2000, the 49th Miss Universe pageant, was held on 12 May 2000 at the Eleftheria Indoor Hall in Nicosia, Cyprus. Lara Dutta of India was crowned by Mpule Kwelagobe of Botswana as her successor at the end of the event. 79 contestants competed for the title.  It was the second time that India has won the title (the first being in 1994 by Sushmita Sen).

Results

Placements

Final Scores 

 Winner
 First Runner-up
 Second Runner-up
 Top 5 Finalist
 Top 10 Semifinalist
(#) Rank in each round of competition

Selection committee
Final Telecast judges:
 Tony Robbins
 Catherine Bell
 Andre Leon Talley
 Kim Alexis
 Cristián de la Fuente
 Debbie Allen
 Serena Altschul

Contestants 
79 contestants competed for the title.

Notes

Withdrawals
  – Simone Smrekar.
  – No contest due to lack of Sponsorship.
  – No contest due to lack of Sponsorship Until 2003.
  – Miss Cook Islands 1999 and Miss South Pacific 1999, Liana Scott did not compete due to lack of Sponsorship.
  – Miss Curaçao 2000, Jozaïne Wall, couldn't participate because she was underage. Jozaïne successfully sued the Miss Curaçao organization due to this issue and went to Miss World 2000 instead.
  – No contest due to lack of Sponsorship.
  – No contest due to lack of Sponsorship.
  – Miss Northern Marianas International 1999, Michelle Boyer Sablan did not participate for undisclosed reasons.
  – No contest held and they lost their Miss Universe licence.
  – Miss Turkey 2000, 1° Runner up Gamze Özçelik was replaced by Cansu Dere because Özçelik was underage at the time, but Cansu Dere was forbidden by the Turkish Government to travel to the Miss Universe 2000 pageant in Cyprus, due to the current tense Turkish-Cypriot relationships over Northern Cyprus.
  – No contest.
  – Sidonia Mwape – Due to lack of Sponsorship.

Replacements

  – Miss Hungary Universe 2000, Ágnes Nagy couldn't participate due personal reazons, her 1° Runner Up – Izabella Kiss remplaced her.

  – Miss Italia 1999, Manila Nazzaro was the initial Italian representative to Miss Universe 2000, but the Miss Italia Organization lost their Miss Universe licence that year due to MUO objections that the national contest was opened to married women and mothers since 1994. Then a new contest called The Miss for Miss Universe was organized by the American – Italian actress Clarissa Burtt from 2000 to 2005. Annalisa Guadalupi won the first edition and she also competed against Manila Nazzaro at Miss Italia 1999 contest.
  – Initially Miss Russia organizers wanted to send Miss Russia 1997–1998, Yelena Rogozhina to Miss Universe 2000, but her victory at the Miss Europe 1999 contest in Lebanon made her unable to compete at Miss Universe. The winner of Miss Russia 1999, Anna Kruglova, also was ineligible for Miss Universe due to her being underage at the time. Then, the organizers of the Miss Russia contest decided to pick Miss Russia 1999 – first runner-up, Svetlana Goreva for Miss Universe 2000.
  – Initially chose Martina Thorogood to represent their country at both Miss Universe and Miss World 1999. Miss Universe officials objected to this as Thorogood placed first runner-up at Miss World 99 and there was a chance that she could become Miss World should the winner resign or lose her crown. Then MVO wanted to send Miss Venezuela 1999 1° Runner Up – Norkys Batista to Miss Universe 2000, but because she wasn't the national official titleholder, the Miss Universe officials rejected their participation. Finally a smaller pageant was held among delegates who had competed in previous Miss Venezuela competitions, and Claudia Moreno was chosen to compete at Miss Universe. Moreno went on to place first runner-up. Both Venezuelan candidates placed second in their respective competitions to the candidates from India

Returns 
Last competed in 1982
 

Last competed in 1996
 

Last competed in 1998

Crossovers
Miss Intercontinental

1997:  - Lara Dutta (Winner)

Awards 
  - Miss Congeniality (Tamara Scaroni)
  - Miss Photogenic (Helen Lindes)
  - Best National Costume (Letty Murray)

Other notes 
 It was confirmed by a local newspaper in Cyprus, after the pageant, that the following contestants rounded out the top 15: Czech Republic (11th), Netherlands (12th), Panama (13th), Germany (14th), and Japan (15th).

Host city 
Nicosia was announced as host city of the pageant on 1 July 1999. The country invested $3.5 million in the event, in the hope that the publicity would increase tourism, the island's main industry.

Conservative Cypriot church leaders protested the decision to hold the pageant on the island, claiming that millennium celebrations of the birth of Christ were more important and that the event was scandalous and would promote female nudity.

General references

References

External links 

 Miss Universe official website

2000
2000 in Cyprus
2000 beauty pageants
Beauty pageants in Cyprus
Culture in Nicosia
May 2000 events in Europe